For All Eternity may refer to:
 For All Eternity (film)
 For All Eternity (band)